River Park Towers or the Harlem River Park Towers are two 38-story, and two 44-story residential buildings in the Bronx, New York City.  Completed in 1975, they became the tallest buildings in the borough, ahead of Tracey Towers and the multiple high-rises encompassing Co-op City. Currently, no other building in the Bronx has exceeded this height. Designed by Davis, Brody & Associates, both buildings were built with the intention to provide affordable, yet somewhat modern housing to the working class.

Construction 
In 1955, the Mitchell-Lama Housing Program was signed into law. This program encouraged subsidized housing and many such projects sprung up throughout the city and state.  With companies created to specialize is such projects, loans of around 90% to 95% of each project's cost were given.  In addition, state bonds with low interest rates allowed rents to be relatively low despite providing modern amenities.  This allowed the River Park Towers, two modern skyscrapers, to be constructed while housing middle-income tenants.

The area purchased (at a very low price) was industrial, with the Metro-North Railroad's Hudson Line, the Major Deegan Expressway, and the Harlem River nearby for transportation.  The towers are not far from other high-rises, though they are far taller than their companions. The Towers are located in Morris Heights, a residential neighborhood in the Bronx, at 10, 20, 30, and 40 Richman Plaza.  The Towers were sponsored by the New York State Urban Development Corporation, a public agency created by the act of the same name in 1968. Due to this sponsorship, work could commence here. The towers were completed in 1975.

History

1990s
During the late 1990s, an era marked with rampant arson, crime, and drug use, and with a shift of the management company, the living conditions started to deteriorate. Even recently, the quality of living is poor for its tenants, with elevator issues and unfair rents.  Many of the inhabitants feel discomfort.  Drug rings and gangs are also known to have done activity in the towers.  As a result, Bronxites generally view the towers as unsafe and borderline impoverished.

21st century
By the year 2020, incidents of violence had decreased from its 1980s heyday, but drugs and gangs remained a problem. It was reported that residents often had to wait for up to an hour for the elevators, which broke down frequently, "with people crowding the hallways like commuters trying to push into the subway at rush hour." Monthly rent for a four-bedroom apartment in the towers reportedly cost $1,978, with 70 percent of the 5,000 tenants receiving rent subsidies.

In 2021, DThang Gz (real name Daniel Collins), a drill rapper, cousin of Kay Flock, and resident of the River Park Towers, was named as "one of the best drill rappers in the Empire State". However, in December 2021, he was arrested on a firearm charge, later being included in an indictment of the RPT/YGz (Young Gunnaz) gang, in May 2022.

COVID-19 pandemic
The COVID-19 pandemic struck hard in working-class neighborhoods in the Bronx, and it especially affected dense low-income housing. Many River Park residents worked in occupations such as home health aides, grocery clerks, delivery men, pharmacists, and first respondents, often without the protection of health insurance, paid sick time, or unions. As these occupations were often considered "essential workers," it meant many residents were exposed to COVID-19 at their jobs. By May 2020 it was estimated that "as many as 100 residents" of River Park Towers had contracted with the virus, with The New York Times calling it a "virus hot spot."

References 

Residential buildings in the Bronx
Apartment buildings in New York City
Residential buildings completed in 1975
Morris Heights, Bronx
Skyscrapers in the Bronx
Brutalist architecture in New York City